Geumgoksa or Geumgok Temple is a Buddhist temple in Gangjin county, South Jeolla province, South Korea.  Its name means "Golden Valley Temple."  Three temples and numerous smaller shrines and burial mounds comprise the site.  It is noted for its scenic beauty as well as a 3-tiered stone pagoda that dates to the Goryo Dynasty.

See also
Boeunsan

External links
Profile from koreatemple.net, in Korean

Taego Buddhist temples
Gangjin County
Buddhist temples in South Korea
Buildings and structures in South Jeolla Province